Vietnam participated in the 2010 Asian Para Games in Guangzhou, China on 13–19 December 2010.

Competitors

Medal summary

Medal table

Medalists

2010 in Vietnamese sport
Sport in Vietnam
Vietnam
Vietnam at the Asian Para Games